Pope Mina I of Alexandria was the 47th Pope of Alexandria and Patriarch of the See of St. Mark.

8th-century Coptic Orthodox popes of Alexandria
Coptic Orthodox saints
8th-century Christian saints